Tuckers Corners is an unincorporated community in Flannigan Township, Hamilton County, Illinois, United States.

Notes

Unincorporated communities in Hamilton County, Illinois
Unincorporated communities in Illinois